Son of Dawn may refer to

 Lucifer, the religious figure
  Son of Dawn, a novel written for the Mystara realm of Dungeons & Dragons